Thaweekun Thong-on, born March 1, 1998) is a Thai professional footballer who plays as an attacking midfielder for Thai League 3 side Sisaket United.

External links

1998 births
Living people
Thaweekun Thong-on
Thaweekun Thong-on
Association football midfielders
Thaweekun Thong-on
Thaweekun Thong-on
Thaweekun Thong-on